Nilus Kerameus (? – 1 February 1388) was the Orthodox Patriarch of Constantinople between spring 1380 and 1388.  He was a Hesychast.

In 1380, he convened a synod to decide the metropolitanate of Moscow, choosing Bulgarian-born Hesychast Cyprian (1336–1406).

In 1382, Stephen of Perm wrote a letter to Nilus concerning the Strigolniki schism.

References 

14th-century patriarchs of Constantinople
Hesychasts
1388 deaths